Khaleda Zia (born Khaleda Khanam Putul in 1945) is a Bangladeshi politician who served as the Prime Minister of Bangladesh from March 1991 to March 1996, and again from June 2001 to October 2006. She was the first female prime minister of Bangladesh. She is the widow of former President of Bangladesh Ziaur Rahman. She is the chairperson and leader of the Bangladesh Nationalist Party (BNP) since 1984, which was founded by her late husband in 1978.

After a military coup in 1982, led by Army Chief General Hussain Muhammad Ershad, Zia helped lead the movement for democracy until the fall of Ershad in 1990. She became the prime minister following the BNP party win in the 1991 general election. She also served briefly in the short-lived government in 1996, when other parties had boycotted the first election. In the next round of general elections of 1996, the Awami League came to power. Her party came to power again in 2001. She has been elected to five separate parliamentary constituencies in the general elections of 1991, 1996 and 2001.

She developed a reputation as the "Uncompromising leader" due to her staunch opposition against military dictatorship of Ershad in the 1980s and her commitment to restore democracy in Bangladesh. She was put under house arrest several times by Ershad government, and later by Sheikh Hasina led government. She was honored as “Fighter for Democracy” by the New Jersey’s State Senate in 2011.

In its list of the 100 Most Powerful Women in the World, Forbes magazine ranked Zia at number 14 in 2004, number 29 in 2005, and number 33 in 2006.

Following her government's term end in 2006, the scheduled January 2007 elections were delayed due to political violence and in-fighting, resulting in a bloodless military takeover of the caretaker government. During its interim rule, it charged Zia and her two sons with corruption.

Since the 1980s, Zia's chief rival has been Awami League leader Sheikh Hasina. Since 1991, they have been the only two serving as the Prime Minister of Bangladesh.

Zia was jailed for a total of 17 years for the Zia Orphanage Trust corruption case and Zia Charitable Trust corruption case in 2018. A local court handed her the verdict for abusing power as the prime minister while disbursing a fund in favor of newly formed Zia Orphanage Trust. Referring to the international and domestic legal experts, the U.S. State Department in its 2020 Country Reports on Human Rights Practices opined that “lack of evidence to support the conviction” suggests the case was a political ploy to remove her from the electoral process. Amnesty International raised concerns that her “fair trial rights are not respected.”

Zia was transferred to a hospital for medical treatment in April 2019. In March 2020, she was released for six months on humanitarian grounds with the conditions that she would stay at her home in Gulshan, Dhaka and not travel abroad. She is also informally prohibited from making political moves, as doing so would result in re-imprisonment. In September 2022, the 6-month period suspension of her sentence was granted for the sixth consecutive time.

Personal life and family

Early life and education
Khaleda Khanam "Putul" was born in 1945 in Jalpaiguri in the then undivided Dinajpur District in Bengal Presidency, British India (now in Jalpaiguri District, India) but her ancestral home is in Fulgazi, Feni She was the third of five children of tea-businessman father Iskandar Ali Majumder, who was from Fulgazi, Feni District and mother Taiyaba Majumder, who was from Chandbari (now in Uttar Dinajpur District).  According to her father, Khal After the partition of India in 1947, they migrated to Dinajpur town (now in Bangladesh). Khanam first attended Dinajpur Missionary School and later completed her matriculation from Dinajpur Girls' School in 1960. In the same year, she married Ziaur Rahman, then a captain in the Pakistan Army. She then used the name "Khaleda Zia" or "Begum Khaleda Zia". Zia then studied at Dinajpur Surendranath College until 1965 when she went to West Pakistan to stay with her husband.  In March 1969, they moved from Karachi to Dhaka. Following Rahman's posting, the family then moved to Sholoshohor area in Chittagong.
She was a prisoner at Dhaka Cantonment in 1971 at the time of Freedom Fight/Liberation War of Independence under custody of Pakistan Army's Major General Jamshed.

Family

Zia's first son, Tarique Rahman (b. 1967), got involved into politics and went on to become the acting chairman of Bangladesh Nationalist Party. Her second son, Arafat Rahman "Koko" (b. 1969), died of a cardiac arrest in 2015. Zia's sister, Khurshid Jahan (1939–2006) served as the Minister of Women and Children Affairs during 2001–2006. Her younger brother, Sayeed Iskander (1953–2012), was also a politician who served as a Jatiya Sangsad member from the Feni-1 constituency during 2001–2006. Her second brother, Shamim Iskandar, is a retired flight engineer of Bangladesh Biman. Her second sister is Selina Islam.

Involvement in politics

On 30 May 1981, Khaleda Zia's husband, the-then President of Bangladesh Ziaur Rahman, was assassinated. After his death, on 2 January 1982, she got involved into politics by first becoming a member of Bangladesh Nationalist Party (BNP) - the party which was founded by Rahman. She took charge of the vice-chairman position in March 1983.

Anti-Ershad Movement

In March 1982, the then chief of Bangladesh Army, Hussain Muhammad Ershad forced Bangladesh's President Justice Abdus Sattar to resign and become the Chief Martial Law Administrator (CMLA) of the country. This marked the beginning of a nine-year-long military dictatorship in Bangladesh.

BNP and 7 party alliance

Begum Khaleda Zia, from the first day of Ershad's rule, protested the military dictatorship and had a very uncompromising stance. She became the Senior Vice-President of BNP by May 1983. Under her active leadership, BNP started discussing the possibilities of a unified movement with six other parties on 12 August 1983 and formed a '7 party alliance' by the first week of September 1983. BNP, led by Khaleda Zia also reached an action-based agreement with other political parties to launch a movement against Ershad.

On 30 September 1983, Begum Khaleda Zia led the first major public rally in front of the party office and was hailed by the party workers. On 28 November 1983, she took part in the "gherao movement" (encircling) of the Secretariat building at Dhaka along with the alliance leaders, which was quelled by Ershad's ruthless police force and she was put under house arrest on the same day.

Due to the deteriorating health conditions, Justice Abdus Sattar resigned from the position of BNP chief on 13 January 1984 and was replaced by Begum Khaleda Zia who was then the Senior Vice President of the party. In May 1984, she was elected as the Chairperson of the party in a council by the councilors.

After assuming the position of party chief, Khaleda Zia spearheaded the movement against Ershad. In 1984, along with other parties, she declared 6 February as the 'Demand Day' and 14 February as 'Protest Day'. Country-wide rallies were organized on those days and activists of the movement died on the streets fighting the ruthless police force loyal to President Ershad.

The 7-party alliance held a countrywide 'Mass Resistance Day' on 9 July 1984, In support of their demand for the immediate withdrawal of Martial Law, the opposition forces called the countrywide gherao and demonstrations from 16–20 September and a full day hartal on 27 September of 1984.

The protests continued in 1985 as well and as a result, in March of the same year Ershad-led government tightened the grip of martial law and put Begum Khaleda Zia under house arrest.

Boycotting 1986 election

To divert the political pressure, Lt. General Ershad declared a date for a fresh election in 1986. Initially, the two major opposition alliances, '7 party alliance' led by BNP and '15 party alliance' led by Awami League discussed the possibilities of participating in the election forming a greater election alliance to catch Ershad off the guard. But Awami League refused to form any election alliance and Sheikh Hasina in a public rally declared anyone who would join the election under Ershad would be a 'national traitors', on 19 March 1986.

However, Sheikh Hasina's Awami League, along with Communist Party of Bangladesh and six other parties, joined the election under Ershad, resulting in the split between the 15 party alliance, On the other hand, Begum Khaleda Zia uncompromisingly declared the election illegal and urged people to resist the election.

The government of Ershad put her under house arrest on the eve of the election while Awami League, Bangladesh Jamaat-e-Islami, Communist Party of Bangladesh and other smaller parties took part in the election only to lose to the Jatiya Party of Ershad.

Begum Khaleda Zia's uncompromising attitude and her defiance to the military dictatorship made an image of an "Uncompromising leader" in the eyes of people. Dr Gowher Rizvi in his analysis wrote:

Later in that year, on the eve of 1986 Bangladeshi presidential election, Khaleda Zia was put under house arrest once again.

Fall of Ershad

Khaleda Zia was put under house arrest multiple times from 1986 to 1990 by Ershad's military government.

On 13 October 1986, she was put under house arrest right before the 1986 Bangladeshi presidential election and was released only after the election. She took the lead on her release and initiated a fresh movement with a view to deposing Ershad. She called a half-day strike on 10 November of the same year only to be put under house arrest again.

On 24 January 1987, when Sheikh Hasina joined the parliament session with other Awami League leaders, Khaleda Zia was on the street demanding the dissolution of the parliament. She called for a mass rally in Dhaka which turned violent and top leaders of BNP were arrested. After that, a series of strikes were organized by 7 party alliance led by Khaleda Zia from February to July 1987. On 22 October of the year, Khaleda Zia's BNP in collaboration with Sheikh Hasina's Awami League declared "Dhaka Seize" programme on 10 November to overthrow Ershad.

As a countermeasure, Ershad's government rounded up thousands of political leaders and activists, but on the day of seizing there were complete chaos on the streets and dozens died. The government of Ershad put Khaleda Zia under house arrest after detaining her from Purbani Hotel, from where she was coordinating the movement. On 11 December 1987, Khaleda was set free but she immediately held a press conference and claimed that she was "prepared to die" to depose the dictator.

After the eventful 1987, two following years went relatively calm with sporadic violence. A fresh wave of movements started when BNP's student wing Chatra Dal started winning most of the student union elections across the country. By 1990, Chatra Dal took control of 270 out of 321 student unions of the country, riding on the popularity of Khaleda Zia. They also won all the posts of Dhaka University Central Students' Union in 1990. The new committee of DUCSU led by Amanullah Aman declared fresh programmes to overthrow Ershad in line with BNP's programmes. On 10 October 1990, in a violent turn of events Chatra Dal leader Naziruddin Jehad died on the street of Dhaka that paved the way for a greater alliance between all the opposition forces.

After two-month-long protests, BNP led by Begum Khaleda Zia, along with other political parties, compelled Ershad to offer his resignation on 4 December 1990.

Premiership

Begum Khaleda Zia served as the Prime Minister of Bangladesh for three times. Her first term was from March 1991 to February 1996, second term lasted for a few weeks after February 1996 and third term was from October 2001 to October 2006. She is particularly remembered for her role in making education accessible and introducing some key economic reforms.

First term

A neutral caretaker government in Bangladesh oversaw elections on 27 February 1991 following eight years of Ershad presidency. BNP won 140 seats - 11 short of simple majority. Zia was sworn in as the country's first female prime minister on 20 March 1991 with the support of a majority of the deputies in parliament. With a unanimous vote, the parliament passed the 12th amendment to the constitution in August 1991. The acting president Shahabuddin Ahmed granted Zia nearly all of the powers that were vested in the president at the time, effectively returning Bangladesh to a parliamentary system in September.

Education reforms

When Begum Khaleda Zia took charge in 1991, Bangladeshi children's average schooling years was around two years and for every three boys there was one girl studying in the same classroom. Begum Khaleda Zia promoted education and vocational training very aggressively. Her government made primary education free and mandatory for all. And for girls, the education was made free till 10th grade.

To fund the implementation of new reforms and policies, in 1994 the allocation of budget in education sector was increased by 60% and received the highest allocation among other sectors.

In 1990, only 31.73% students passed in the SSC examination and the rate was 30.11% for female. In 1995, thanks to her policies, 73.2% students passed the SSC examination and among the female students, 71.58% passed.

Economic reforms

Some of the major economic reforms marked the first Khaleda Zia government that included the introduction of Value Added Tax (VAT), formulation of Bank Company Act in 1991 and Financial Institutions Act in 1993, and the establishment of privatization board in 1993. Besides, Bangladesh signed the General Agreement on Tariffs and Trade in 1993.

A new export processing zone was established near Dhaka in 1993 to attract foreign investors.

Administrative reforms

The first Khaleda Zia government, to address popular demand, passed a law to allow the mayors of city corporations to be elected directly by the voters. Before that the elected ward councilors of each ward of the city corporation used to elect the mayor of the city.

Zia's administration abolished the Upazila system in November 1991. It formed the Local Government Structure Review Commission, which recommended a two-tier system of local government, district and union councils. Also the Thana Development and Coordination Committee was formed to coordinate development activities at the thana level.

Second term
When the opposition boycotted the 15 February 1996 election, Zia's party BNP had a landslide victory in the 6th Jatiya Sangshad. Other major parties demanded a neutral caretaker government to be appointed to oversee the elections. The short-lived parliament hastily introduced the caretaker government by passing the 13th amendment to the constitution. The parliament was dissolved to pave the way for parliamentary elections within 90 days.

In the 12 June 1996 elections, BNP lost to Sheikh Hasina's Awami League. Winning 116 seats, BNP emerged as the largest opposition party in the country's parliamentary history.

Third term

The BNP formed a four-party alliance on 6 January 1999 to increase its chances to return to power in the next general elections. These included its former political foe the Jatiya Party, founded by President Ershad after he led a military government, and the Islamic parties of Jamaat-e-Islami Bangladesh and the Islami Oikya Jot. It encouraged protests against the ruling Awami League.

Many residents strongly criticized Zia and BNP for allying with Jamaat-e-Islami, which had opposed the independence of Bangladesh in 1971. The four-party alliance participated in the 1 October 2001 general elections, winning two-thirds of the seats in parliament and 46% of the vote (compared to the principal opposition party's 40%). Zia was sworn in as the Prime Minister of Bangladesh.

She worked on a 100-day programme to fulfill most of her election pledges to the nation. During this term, the share of domestic resources in economic development efforts grew. Bangladesh began to attract a higher level of international investment for development of the country's infrastructure, energy resources and businesses, including from the United States, Great Britain, and Japan. Restoration of law and order was an achievement during the period.

Zia promoted neighbourly relations in her foreign policy. In her "look-east policy," she worked to bolster regional cooperation in South Asia and adherence to the UN Charter of Human Rights. She negotiated settlement of international disputes, and renounced the use of force in international relations. Bangladesh began to participate in United Nations international peacekeeping efforts. In 2006, Forbes magazine featured her administration in a major story praising her achievements. Her government worked to educate young girls (nearly 70% of Bangladeshi women were illiterate) and distribute food to the poor (half of Bangladesh's 135 million people live below the poverty line). Her government promoted strong GDP growth (5%) based on economic reforms and support of an entrepreneurial culture.

When Zia became prime minister for the third time, the GDP growth rate of Bangladesh remained above 6 percent. The Bangladesh per capita national income rose to 482 dollars. Foreign exchange reserve of Bangladesh had crossed 3 billion dollars from the previous 1 billion dollars. The foreign direct investments of Bangladesh had risen to 2.5 billion dollars. The industrial sector of the GDP had exceeded 17 percent at the end of Zia's office.

On 29 October 2006, Zia's term in office ended. In accordance with the constitution, a caretaker government would manage in the 90-day interim before general elections. On the eve of the last day, rioting broke out on the streets of central Dhaka due to uncertainty over who would become Chief Advisor (head of the Caretaker Government of Bangladesh). Under the constitution, the immediate past Chief Justice was to be appointed. But, Chief Justice Khondokar Mahmud Hasan (K M Hasan) declined the position. President Iajuddin Ahmed, as provided for in the constitution, assumed power as Chief Advisor on 29 October 2006. He tried to arrange elections and bring all political parties to the table during months of violence; 40 people were killed and hundreds injured in the first month after the government's resignation in November 2006.

Mukhlesur Rahman Chowdhury, the presidential advisor, met with Zia and Sheikh Hasina, and other political parties to try to resolve issues and schedule elections. Negotiations continued against a backdrop of political bickering, protests and polarisation that threatened the economy. Officially on 26 December 2006, all political parties joined the planned 22 January 2007 elections. The Awami League pulled out at the last minute, and in January the military intervened to back the caretaker government for a longer interim period. It held power until holding general elections in December 2008.

Foreign policy
 Saudi Arabia: Zia made some high-profile foreign visits in the later part of 2012. Invited to Saudi Arabia in August by the royal family, she met with the Saudi crown prince and defence minister Salman bin Abdulaziz Al Saud to talk about bilateral ties. She tried to promote better access for Bangladeshi migrant workers to the Saudi labour market, which was in decline at the time.
 People's Republic of China: She went to People's Republic of China in October, at the invitation of the government. She met with Chinese leaders including Vice President Xi Jinping and the Communist Party of China's international affairs chief Wang Jiarui. Xi became China's Paramount Leader in 2012.

Talks in China related to trade and prospective Chinese investment in Bangladesh, particularly the issue of financing Padma Bridge. At the beginning of 2012, the World Bank, a major prospective financier, had withdrawn, accusing government ministers of graft. The BNP announced that the Chinese funding for a second Padma Bridge was confirmed during her visit.
 India: On 28 October 2012, Zia visited India to meet with President Pranab Mukherjee, Prime Minister Manmohan Singh and a number of officials including foreign minister Salman Khurshid, national security adviser Shivshankar Menon, foreign secretary Ranjan Mathai and BJP leader and leader of opposition Sushma Swaraj. Talks were scheduled to cover bilateral trade and regional security.

Zia's India visit was considered notable as BNP had been considered to have been anti-India compared to its rival Awami League. At her meeting with Prime Minister Singh, Zia said her party wanted to work with India for mutual benefit, including the fight against extremism. Indian officials announced they had come to agreement with her to pursue a common geopolitical doctrine in the greater region to discourage terrorists.

Post-premiership (since 2007)

Detention during the caretaker government
Former Bangladesh Bank governor Fakhruddin Ahmed became the Chief Adviser to the interim caretaker government on 12 January 2007. In March, Zia's eldest son, Tarique Rahman, was arrested for corruption. Enforcing the suppression of political activity under the state of emergency, from 9 April, the government barred politicians from visiting Zia's residence. Her other son, Arafat Rahman (Coco), was arrested for corruption on 16 April. On 17 April, The Daily Star reported that Zia had agreed to go into exile with  Arafat. Her family said, the Saudi Arabian government reportedly declined to allow her into the kingdom - apparently because "it was reluctant to take in an unwilling guest". Based on an appeal, on 22 April the High Court issued a ruling for the government to explain that she was not confined to her house. On 25 April, the government lifted restrictions on both Zia and Sheikh Hasina. On 7 May, the High Court ordered the government to explain continuing restrictions on Zia.

On 17 July, the Anti Corruption Commission Bangladesh (ACC) sent notices to both Zia and Hasina, requesting that details of their assets be submitted to the commission within one week. Zia was asked to appear in court on 27 September in connection with a case for not submitting service returns for Daily Dinkal Publications Limited for years. On 2 September, the government filed charges of corruption against Zia related to the awarding of contracts to Global Agro Trade Company in 2003. She was arrested on 3 September. She was detained in a makeshift prison on the parliament building premises. On the same day, Zia expelled her party Secretary General Abdul Mannan Bhuiyan and Joint Secretary General Whip Ashraf Hossain for breaching party discipline.

BNP standing committee members chose former Minister of Finance Saifur Rahman and former Minister of Water Resources Hafizuddin Ahmed to lead the party. Bangladesh Election Commission subsequently invited Hafizuddin's faction, rather than Zia's, to participate in talks, effectively recognizing the former as the legitimate BNP. Zia challenged this in court, but her appeal was rejected on 10 April 2008.

Zia was released on bail on 11 September 2008 from her yearlong detention.

In December 2008, the caretaker government organized general elections where Zia's party lost to the Awami League and its Grand Alliance (with 13 smaller parties) which took a two-thirds majority of seats in the parliament. Sheikh Hasina became the prime minister, and her party formed government in early 2009. Zia became the opposition leader of the parliament.

Eviction from the cantonment house
Zia's family had been living for 38 years in the 2.72-acre plot house at 6 Shaheed Mainul Road house in Dhaka Cantonment. It was the official residence of her husband, Ziaur Rahman, when he was appointed as the Deputy Chief of Staff (DCS) of the Bangladesh Army. After he became the President of Bangladesh, he kept the house as his residence. Following his assassination in 1981, the acting President Abdus Sattar, leased the house "for life" to Zia, for a nominal ৳101. When the army took over the government in 1983, Hussain Mohammad Ershad confirmed this arrangement.

On 20 April 2009, the Directorate of Military Lands and Cantonments handed a notice asking Zia to vacate the cantonment residence. Several allegations and irregularities mentioned in the notice - first, Zia had been carrying out political activities from the house – which went against a condition of the allotment; second, one cannot get an allotment of two government houses in the capital; third, a civilian cannot get a resident lease within a cantonment. Zia vacated the house on 13 November 2010. She then moved to the residence of her brother, Sayeed Iskandar, at the Gulshan neighborhood.

Boycotting 2014 election
Zia's party took a stance on not participating in the 2014 Bangladeshi general election unless it was administered under a  nonpartisan  caretaker government, but the then Prime Minister Sheikh Hasina rejected the demand. The Bangladesh Awami League, led by Hasina, won the election in 232 seats (out of 300). The official counts from Dhaka suggested that the turnout here averaged about 22 percent.

In 2016, BNP announced its new National Standing Committee, in which Zia retained her position as the chairperson.

In 2017, the police conducted a raid on Zia's house  search for "anti-state" documents.

Charges and imprisonment in 2018
On 3 July 2008, during the 2007–08 caretaker government rule, ACC had filed a graft case, accusing Zia and five others of misappropriating over Tk 2.1 crore that had come from a foreign bank as grants for orphans. According to the case, on 9 June 1991, $1.255M (Tk 4.45 crore) grant was transferred from United Saudi Commercial Bank to Prime Minister's Orphanage Fund - a fund that was created by then Prime Minister Zia shortly before the transfer of the grant as part of the embezzlement scheme. On 5 September 1993, she issued a Tk 2.33 crore cheque from the Prime Minister's Orphanage Fund to the Zia Orphanage Trust on the pretext of building an orphanage in Bogra. By April 2006, the deposited amount grew to Tk 3.37 crore with accrued interest. In April, June and July 2006, some of the money was transferred to bank accounts of three other accused – Salimul, Mominur and Sharfuddin – through different transactions. On 15 February 2007, Tk 2.10 crore was withdrawn through pay orders from two of the FDR accounts. Zia was accused of misappropriating that money by transferring the amount from a public fund to a private one.

On 8 February 2018, during the Awami League government rule, Zia was sentenced to prison for five years in that corruption case. Mobile phone jammers were installed at Bakshibazar court premises ahead of the verdict. Her party claimed that the verdict was politically biased. Zia was sent to the Old Dhaka Central Jail after the verdict. She was imprisoned as the sole inmate at the jail since all the inmates had been transferred to the newly built Dhaka Central Jail in Keraniganj in 2016. On 11 February 2018, Dhaka Special Judge's Court 5 directed the authorities of Dhaka Central Jail to provide first class division to Zia. On 31 October 2018, the High Court raised her jail term to 10 years after ACC pleaded for a revision.

On 30 October 2018, in another case, Zia Charitable Trust Graft Case, Zia was sentenced to 7 years of rigorous imprisonment. Khaleda is also accused in other 32 cases including Gatco Graft Case, Niko Graft Case, Barapukuria Coalmine Graft Case, Darussalam Police Station Cases, Jatrabari Police Station Cases, Sedition Case, Bomb Attack on Shipping Minister Case, Khulna Arson Case, Comilla Arson Case, Celebrating Fake Birthday Case, Undermining National Flag Case and Loan Default Case.

Zia's nomination papers to contest for Feni-1, Bogra-6 and Bogra-7 constituencies at the 2018 general election were rejected. She was not able to contest because according to article 66 (2) (d) of the constitution, "a person shall be disqualified for election as, or for being, a member of parliament who has been, on conviction for a criminal offence involving moral turpitude, sentenced to imprisonment for a term of not less than two years, unless a period of five years has elapsed since his/her release". Her party lost that general election to Awami League.

Zia was admitted to Bangabandhu Sheikh Mujib Medical University for medical treatment on 1 April 2019. The High Court and the Supreme Court rejected her bail plea on humanitarian grounds a total four times.

On 25 March 2020, Zia was released from prison for six months, conditioned she would stay at her home in Gulshan and not leave the country. The government issued this executive decision as per section 401 (1) of the Criminal Code of Procedure (CrPC). As of November 2021, the term of her release has so far been extended four times.

Illness 
Zia has been suffering from chronic kidney conditions, decompensated liver diseases, unstable haemoglobin, diabetes, rheumatoid arthritis and other age-related complications. In April 2021, several staff members in Zia's home tested positive for COVID-19. Zia also found to have contracted the virus but she exhibited no symptoms and recovered later. On 28 November, the medical board formed for Zia's treatment announced that she had been suffering from liver cirrhosis. Plea for allowing to fly abroad for medical care has been denied by the court. Zia underwent treatment at Evercare Hospital in Dhaka during 27 April–19 June 2021, 12 October–3 November 2021 and again since 14 November 2021. On 9 January 2022, Zia was transferred from critical care unit (CCU).

Birth date discrepancy
Zia claims 15 August as her birthday, which is a matter of controversy in Bangladesh politics. 15 August is the day many immediate family members of Zia's political rival, Sheikh Hasina, including her father Sheikh Mujibur Rahman were killed. As a result of the deaths, 15 August is officially declared National Mourning Day of Bangladesh. None of Zia's government issued identification documents show her birthday on 15 August. Khaleda Zia's father claimed that his daughter's date of birth is 5 September 1945.  Her matriculation examination certificate lists a birth date of 9 August 1945. Her marriage certificate lists 5 September 1945. Zia's passport indicates a birth date of 19 August 1945. Kader Siddiqui, a political ally of Zia, urged her not to celebrate her birthday on 15 August. The High Court filed a petition against Zia on this issue.

Awards and honours
 On 24 May 2011, the New Jersey State Senate honoured Zia as a "Fighter for Democracy". It was the first time the state Senate had so honoured any foreign leader and reflects the state's increasing population of immigrants and descendants from South Asia.

Eponyms

 Begum Khaleda Zia Hall, a residential hall at Islamic University, Kushtia.
 Deshnetri Begum Khaleda Zia Hall, a residential hall at the University of Chittagong.
 Begum Khaleda Zia Hall,  a residential hall at Jahangirnagar University.
 Begum Khaleda Zia Hall, a residential hall at the University of Rajshahi.

Bibliography

See also 

 List of international prime ministerial trips made by Khaleda Zia

References
Footnotes

Citations

External links
 
 
 
 
 

|-

|-

|-

|-

|-

|-

|-

|-

|-

|-

Living people
1945 births
20th-century Bangladeshi women politicians
21st-century Bangladeshi women politicians
Bangladesh Nationalist Party politicians
Chairpersons of the Bangladesh Nationalist Party
Bangladeshi Muslims
First Ladies of Bangladesh
People from Bogra District
People from Dinajpur District, Bangladesh
People from Fulgazi Upazila
Prime Ministers of Bangladesh
Women members of the Jatiya Sangsad
Women opposition leaders
Women prime ministers
Ziaur Rahman
Leaders of the Opposition (Bangladesh)
Bangladeshi politicians convicted of crimes
Bangladeshi prisoners and detainees
5th Jatiya Sangsad members
6th Jatiya Sangsad members
7th Jatiya Sangsad members
8th Jatiya Sangsad members
9th Jatiya Sangsad members
Heads of government who were later imprisoned
Female defence ministers
Bangladeshi people of Middle Eastern descent
Prisoners and detainees of Bangladesh
Khaleda Zia
Majumder–Zia family